Doddapaneni Rushi Raj (born 3 April 1986) is an Indian former cricketer. He played five first-class matches for Hyderabad between 2008 and 2009.

See also
 List of Hyderabad cricketers

References

External links
 

1986 births
Living people
Indian cricketers
Hyderabad cricketers
Cricketers from Hyderabad, India